The following is a list of notable events and releases of the year 2018 in Danish music.

Events

January

February
 10 – The artist and song for Denmark in the Eurovision Song Contest 2018 was decided.

March

April

May
 30 – The 20th Distortion festival started in Copenhagen (May 30 - June 3).

June
 9 – The NorthSide Festival opened in Aarhus (June 9–11).
 21 – The 9th Copenhell festival started in Copenhagen (June 21–23).
 28 – The 4th Tinderbox Festival started in Odense (June 28–30).

July
 4 – The 47th Roskilde Festival opened (July 4–7).
 6 – The 38th Copenhagen Jazz Festival started in Copenhagen, Denmark (July 6 – 15).
 11 – G! Festival opensed in Göta, Eysturoy, Faroe Islands (July 11–14).
 14 – The 30th Aarhus Jazz Festival started (July 14–21).

August
 8 – The Strøm Fesatival started in Copenhagen (August 8–11).

September
 5 – The Copenhagen World Music Festival started (September 5–9).

Albums released

February

March

October

Deaths 

 January
 1 – Teddy Edelmann, singer (born 1941).

 August
 16 – Benny Andersen, writer and pianist (born 1929).

 October
 30 – Kim Larsen, rock singer and guitarist, Gasolin' (born 1945).

See also 
Music of Denmark
Denmark in the Eurovision Song Contest 2018

References

 
Danish music
Danish
Music